John Yeamans was a colonial administrator.

John Yeamans may also refer to:

John Yeamans (politician)

See also
John Yeaman, Scottish prisoner